Xorides propinquus is a parasitoid wasp from ichneumonid family that parasitizes long-horned beetles of next species: Trichoferus griseus,  Semanotus russicus, Niphona picticornis.

References

Xoridinae
Insects described in 1868